"Crisis on Infinite Earths" is a 1985 American comic book crossover storyline published by DC Comics. The series, written by Marv Wolfman and pencilled by George Pérez, was first serialized as a 12-issue limited series from April 1985 to March 1986. As the main piece of a crossover event, some plot elements were featured in tie-in issues of other publications. Since its initial publication, the series has been reprinted in various formats and editions.

The idea for the series stemmed from Wolfman's desire to abandon the DC Multiverse depicted in the company's comics—which he thought was unfriendly to readers—and create a single, unified DC Universe (DCU). The foundation of Crisis on Infinite Earths developed through a character (the Monitor) introduced in Wolfman's The New Teen Titans in July 1982 before the series itself started.

At the start of Crisis on Infinite Earths, the Anti-Monitor (the Monitor's evil counterpart) is unleashed on the DC Multiverse and begins to destroy the various Earths that it comprises. The Monitor tries to recruit heroes from around the Multiverse but is murdered, while Brainiac collaborates with the villains to conquer the remaining Earths. However, both the heroes and villains are eventually united by the Spectre; the series concludes with Kal-L, Superboy-Prime and Alexander Luthor Jr. defeating the Anti-Monitor and the creation of a single Earth in place of the Multiverse. Crisis on Infinite Earths is noted for its high death count; hundreds of characters died, including DC icons Kara Zor-El (the original Supergirl) and Barry Allen (the Flash of the Silver Age). The story's events resulted in the entire DCU being rebooted, dividing the fictional universe's timeline into "pre-Crisis" and "post-Crisis" eras.

The series was a bestseller for DC. The story is credited with popularizing the idea of a large-scale crossover in comics. Crisis on Infinite Earths is the first installment in what became known as the Crisis trilogy; it was followed by Infinite Crisis (2005–2006) and Final Crisis (2008–2009). The story also serves as inspiration for "Crisis on Infinite Earths", an Arrowverse crossover event consisting of an episode each of Arrow, The Flash, Supergirl, Legends of Tomorrow and Batwoman.

Publication history

Background
DC Comics is an American comic book publisher best known for its superhero stories featuring characters including Batman, Superman, and Wonder Woman. The company debuted in February 1935 with New Fun: The Big Comic Magazine. Most of DC's comic books (as well as some published under its imprints Vertigo and Young Animal) take place within a shared universe called the DC Universe (DCU) allowing plot elements, characters, and settings to cross over with each other. The concept of the DCU has provided DC's writers some challenges in maintaining continuity, due to conflicting events within different comics that need to reflect the shared nature of the universe. "The Flash of Two Worlds" from The Flash #123 (September 1961), which featured Barry Allen (the Silver Age Flash) teaming up with Jay Garrick (the Golden Age Flash) was the first DC comic to suggest that the DCU was a part of a multiverse.

The DC Multiverse concept was expanded in later years with the DCU having infinite Earths; for example, the Golden Age versions of DC heroes resided on Earth-Two, while DC's Silver Age heroes were from Earth-One. Since "Crisis on Earth-One!" (1963), DC has used the word "Crisis" to describe important crossovers within the DC Multiverse. Over the years, various writers took liberties creating additional parallel Earths as plot devices and to house characters DC had acquired from other companies, making the DC Multiverse a "convoluted mess". DC's comic book sales were also far below those of their competitor Marvel Comics. According to ComicsAlliance journalist Chris Sims, "the [DC] multiverse . . . felt old-fashioned. . . . Marvel, on the other hand, felt contemporary and when you stack them up against each other, there's one difference that sticks out above anything else: Marvel feels unified."

During the Bronze Age of Comic Books, writer Marv Wolfman became popular among DC's readers for his work on Weird War Tales and The New Teen Titans. George Pérez, who illustrated The New Teen Titans, also began to rise to prominence in this era. In 1984, Pérez entered into an exclusive contract with DC, which was later extended one year. Although The New Teen Titans was a major success for DC, the company's comic book sales were still below Marvel's. Wolfman began to attribute this to the DC Multiverse, feeling "The Flash of Two Worlds" had created a "nightmare": it was not reader-friendly for new readers to be able to keep track of and writers struggled with the continuity errors it caused. In The New Teen Titans #21 (July 1982), Wolfman introduced a new character: the shadowy, potentially villainous Monitor; this laid the foundation for Crisis on Infinite Earths.

Development

In 1981, Wolfman was editing Green Lantern. He got a letter from a fan asking why a character did not recognize Green Lantern in a recent issue despite the two having had worked together in an issue three years earlier. Soon afterward, Wolfman pitched Crisis on Infinite Earths as The History of the DC Universe, seeing it as a way to simplify the DCU and attract new readers. The History of the DC Universes title was changed to Crisis of Infinite Earths because its premise, involving the destruction of entire worlds, sounded more like a crisis.

Wolfman said when he pitched the series to DC, he realized it was going to be a completely new beginning for the DCU. "I knew up front, and they did too, how big this was going to be," he said. "But, no-one knew how well it would sell, or whether it would sell at all. It was a risk DC was willing to take, because my thoughts were that DC needed a lot of help at that time, and they did too." Wolfman also said he saw it as an attempt to improve DC's reputation for storytelling. Many readers at the time saw them as old-fashioned.

The crossover was fleshed out and coordinated at a meeting attended by president Jenette Kahn, Paul Levitz, vice president and executive editor Dick Giordano and DC's editors. In 1982, DC hired a researcher to go through their library and read every comic the company had published, a task that took two years. The series was delayed to 1983 due to the time for research, and again to 1985 when it was still not ready for 1983 and to coincide with DC's fiftieth anniversary. As an event like Crisis on Infinite Earths had never happened before, those working on it met for around two hours a week; at the time, this was uncommon.

The groundwork for the series was laid the year before it was published. One of the greatest challenges for Wolfman and Giordano was coming up with a story. Wolfman cited making use of every DC character and creating a plot that was fun to read and filled with surprises as difficulties, as the series needed to sell well; if it did not, it could have caused a disaster for DC. Plotting became easier once a beginning and an ending had been determined and when Pérez became involved. Crisis on Infinite Earths was DC's first mainstream maxiseries, which was still a relatively new concept.

Early in planning for Crisis on Infinite Earths, a list was made of characters that were part of the DCU; characters from other universes, such as those that formerly belonged to Charlton Comics, also were used. According to Wolfman, one of the purposes of Crisis on Infinite Earths was to showcase all the characters DC had. The series is infamous for its high death count. Hundreds of characters died; among the most noted was Barry Allen's. Wolfman has said he did not want to kill Allen, but DC ordered him to because it perceived the character as dull. Therefore, he conceived Allen's death—in which he runs through time before vanishing—as a way to make the character seem more interesting and hopefully spare him. Wolfman wanted to make the series unforgettable; he said that many writers had expressed interest in simplifying DC's continuity and he wanted to be the one to do so.

Pérez says he was not the intended artist for Crisis on Infinite Earths, but was excited when he learned about it, seeing it as an opportunity for "revenge" against Marvel, which he blamed for blocking the JLA/Avengers crossover he had been working on. He enjoyed working with Wolfman again, and took a leave of absence from The New Teen Titans to draw the series. DC initially did not know Pérez would want to work on it. According to Pérez, he was motivated by the fact that DC did not know if the series was going to be a success. He also wanted "to draw everybody I could get my hands on" and called illustrating the series some of the most fun he ever had. Pérez was excited because not only did he get to draw the Teen Titans again, but also obscure characters he was not familiar with, saying he could possibly have never gotten another chance. Wolfman has said one panel in Crisis on Infinite Earths shows the Marvel Universe being destroyed. When Giordano (the series' initial inker) had difficulty meeting deadlines while continuing as DC vice president and executive editor, editorial coordinator Pat Bastienne reassigned the inking to Jerry Ordway despite Giordano's objections.

Publication
The idea for Crisis on Infinite Earths was first noted in the December 1981 issue of The Comics Journal, which mentioned a twelve-part maxiseries scheduled for 1982. The series was announced in Giordano's "Meanwhile..." column DC ran in its titles cover dated June 1984. Giordano warned readers that "odd occurrences" would begin to happen throughout DC's comics. He also clarified it would commemorate DC's fiftieth anniversary and would provide the company "wonderful stepping-stones" for new characters and comics. The series was marketed with the tagline "Worlds will live, worlds will die and nothing will ever be the same".

The series began in January 1985 and lasted for twelve issues, ending in December 1985 (issues cover dated April 1985 through March 1986). The close spacing of Crisis on Infinite Earths and Marvel's similar crossover Secret Wars caused some fans to create conspiracy theories about idea theft. According to writer Steve Gerber, the series "got virtually no promotion ... How many handouts did you see? How many posters did you see in people's windows? How much information was really distributed to the press and how much was gotten just by individual reporters going to Marv Wolfman and [Crisis artist] George Pérez?"

Tie-ins

Elements to set up Crisis on Infinite Earths were put in DC's comics years before the crossover took place; an example of this was the Monitor's appearance in The New Teen Titans. In a January 3, 1983 memo, Giordano, Wolfman, and Len Wein instructed editors and writers to use the Monitor twice in the coming year but not to show him: "Because this series involves the entire DC Universe we do ask that each Editor and writer cooperate with the project by using a character called The Monitor in their books twice during the next year". This served to set up the series. When Wolfman and Giordano reiterated this in a 1984 meeting, some editors were not pleased; one was so miffed he did not speak for the rest of the meeting.

Tie-ins for Crisis on Infinite Earths were published in DC's ongoing series. Unlike the 1991 Marvel crossover storyline The Infinity Gauntlet, where Marvel only published tie-ins in titles that needed a boost in sales, the vast majority of DC's comics featured events that directly tied to the crossover. The following comic book issues were labeled as part of the crossover; their covers contained a banner that read "Special Crisis Cross-Over", along with the logo for DC's fiftieth anniversary.

 All-Star Squadron #50–56
 Amethyst (vol. 2) #13
 Blue Devil (DC Comics) #17-18
 DC Comics Presents #86–88
 The Fury of Firestorm #41–42
 Green Lantern (vol. 2) #194–195; #198
 Infinity, Inc. #18–24; Annual #1
 Justice League of America #244–245; Annual #3
 JLA: Incarnations #5 (released in 2001)
 Legion of Super-Heroes #18
 The Losers Special #1
 The New Teen Titans (vol. 2) #13–14
 The Omega Men #31
 Superman #414–415
 Swamp Thing #46
 Wonder Woman #327–329
 Legends of the DC Universe : Crisis on Infinite Earths #1 (released in 1998)

Collected editions

Synopsis
The conflicting stories of the DCU are explained as a Multiverse, containing many parallel universes and alternate versions of the characters, with the primary DC continuity referred to as Earth-One. They were created after renegade scientist Krona built a machine and used it to look back into the beginning of time. A cosmic being from the beginning known as the Monitor catalogues these realities, but he has an evil counterpart, the Anti-Monitor, who comes from an antimatter universe.

After Pariah causes an accident with antimatter in his universe, the Anti-Monitor is released and begins destroying many of the realities with a wave of antimatter, planning on becoming sole ruler of all realities. To combat this, the Monitor recruits heroes and villains from across time and space to set up five towers, to help merge the multiverse back into one to make it stronger. He is murdered by his protégée, Harbinger, who is possessed by one of the Anti-Monitor's demons. However, he knew this would happen and his death releases enough energy to project two of the last five parallel Earths into a protective limbo. The Anti-Monitor recruits Psycho-Pirate to his cause, infusing him with part of his power to manipulate the heroes of Earth-4, Earth-S and Earth-X against the rest; this fails when all five Earths enter the limbo universe. Harbinger then recruits heroes from the remaining Earths to lead an assault on the Anti-Monitor in the antimatter universe, using the powers of Alexander Luthor Jr., the last survivor of Earth-Three, to open a portal between the limbo and antimatter universes. Pariah tracks down the Anti-Monitor at his fortress, and the heroes destroy a converter, powered by stellar energy, used to destroy the last five Earths; the injured Anti-Monitor retreats and Supergirl dies from his attacks after a distraction from Doctor Light.

During a lull in the war, the villains unite under Brainiac, who kills Earth-Two's Alexei Luthor while recruiting the Earth-One Lex Luthor to conquer the remaining Earths. The Anti-Monitor meanwhile creates a new body for himself and tries to use an antimatter cannon to penetrate the limbo universe and destroy the five partially merged Earths. The Flash (Barry Allen), who's been the Anti-Monitor's prisoner for most of the story, dies stopping this attempt. A furious Anti-Monitor absorbs the energy of millions of worlds and vows to travel back through time to prevent the creation of the multiverse. The Spectre unites the heroes and villains by warning them about the Anti-Monitor's plan; the heroes travel back in time to stop the Anti-Monitor, while the villains travel back in time to the ancient planet Oa to prevent Krona from creating the technology necessary for the Anti-Monitor's plan to succeed. The villains fail, and Krona continues his experiment. The Anti-Monitor waits for Alex Luthor to reopen the portal between the positive and antimatter universes, capturing the heroes, but a magically empowered Spectre creates an energy overload which shatters space and time. The five Earths merge into a single shared universe, and the superheroes return to the present; only those present at the dawn of time remember the original realities.

A cosmically empowered Anti-Monitor attacks again, transporting the new Earth to the antimatter universe and summoning a horde of shadow demons. He falls in a carefully planned counterattack, culminating in a battle with Superboy of Earth-Prime, Kal-L (the Earth-Two Superman), and Alexander Luthor Jr., with help from New Gods adversary Darkseid. In this final battle the Anti-Monitor, reduced to a flaming head, crashes into a star and is killed by Kal-L. Before the star explodes, Alex sends Kal-L, Earth-Two Lois Lane, Earth-Prime Superboy and himself to a pocket "paradise" dimension. This leaves the heroes of the remaining Earth, none of whom remember the original past, to sort out the aftermath of this crisis. Only Psycho-Pirate, who is locked up in Arkham Asylum, remembers the multiverse.

Reception
Despite relatively limited marketing and DC being unsure if the series would be successful, Crisis on Infinite Earths was a bestseller.

IGNs Hilary Goldstein summarized the series as "a crucial turning point for DC Comics" and credited it with saving the company. Goldstein called Wolfman's idea to simplify the DCU bold and unprecedented, noting the story's exceptional size and saying the story was "unbelievable", if somewhat aged. He also praised Pérez's detailed artwork, saying no other artist could have possibly illustrated it as well as he did and gave the book a "must have" rating. Fellow IGN writer Jesse Schedeen named Crisis on Infinite Earths one of the best DC crossovers, agreeing it was unprecedented and dramatic.

Marc Buxton of Comic Book Resources named "Crisis on Infinite Earths" the greatest comic book crossover ever, saying that no crossover has been bigger or as ambitious: "where some events seem hesitant to actually leave a mark on their respective universes, Crisis did it with aplomb". He praised the series for exploring the entire DCU and felt it was a fitting event for DC's fiftieth anniversary. Nerdist News noted that many of the series' central events—such as the deaths of Supergirl and Barry Allen—have become iconic moments in DC's history.

Not all reviewers have been as positive. Chris Sims wrote the series was messy and built awkwardly, describing it as "a textbook definition of style over substance". Sims said it was far from the best work of Wolfman and Pérez; however, he still thought it was groundbreaking, saying, "It's the first time in comics history that EVERYTHING was in danger".

Merchandise
A novelization of Crisis on Infinite Earths was written by Wolfman and published by iBooks in 2005, with cover art by Pérez and Alex Ross. The book follows the events of the original series; most of the story is presented from Barry Allen's point of view, while parts where he is not present are told from a third-person perspective. It also added some details, including internal monologue and updates to make the story more modern, such as characters having cell phones. In 2008, WizKids issued a toy pack centered around the Anti-Monitor as a part of its DC HeroClix toy line. The pack came with a large Anti-Monitor figure with LED-lit eyes, several smaller figures, and a map. An exclusive variant, based on the Sinestro Corps, was available at the San Diego Comic-Con and Gen Con Indy conventions that year.

DC Collectibles (then called DC Direct) released three series of action figures between 2005 and 2006. Based on the George Pérez artwork, the figures had a base with the logo of the series and certain figures included an accessory. The first series included Earth 2 Robin, Harbinger, Monitor, Psycho-Pirate, and Supergirl. Later series included Anti Monitor, Earth 2 Superman, Flash, Battle Armor Lex Luthor, Brainiac,  Earth 1 Batman, Doctor Light, Earth Prime Superboy, Earth 2 Huntress, and Weaponer of Qward.

Legacy
Though it was not the first large-scale comic book crossover, Crisis on Infinite Earths is generally credited with popularizing the idea. Comics historian Matthew K. Manning wrote that Crisis on Infinite Earths paved way for all future crossovers of similar scale, and Andrew J. Friedenthal said "Crisis showed the two major superhero comic book publishers (DC Comics and Marvel Comics) how they could utilize the continuity established by decades' worth of stories to weave together a cohesive, metatextual tapestry that both appealed to long-time readers and brought in massive amounts of money". The series' success inspired DC to begin a tradition of "summer crossovers"; some of these include Invasion! (1988–1989), Armageddon 2001 (1991), Zero Hour: Crisis in Time! (1994), and Identity Crisis (2004), and some mention the events of Crisis on Infinite Earths. The second part of one of DC's later crossovers, Convergence (2015), heavily references the series and sees DC's superheroes travel back to its era. The writers of Convergence all had fun writing stories set during Crisis on Infinite Earths, calling the series an exciting time for DC.

The series had an immediate effect on DC, dividing the company's history into two eras: "Pre-Crisis" and "Post-Crisis". Wolfman and Pérez teamed again to produce the History of the DC Universe limited series to summarize the DCU's new history. In the post-Crisis history, during the "Crisis" many heroes fought the Anti-Monitor's army. He attempted to collapse the positive universe's past and future into a single point in time to destroy it, leaving only the antimatter universe.

Many of DC's characters had their histories rebooted. Wonder Woman's comic was relaunched entirely by Pérez, Wein, and Greg Potter. Superman was first re-envisioned in the limited series The Man of Steel by John Byrne; his comic was retitled The Adventures of Superman to make way for a new Superman series. Batman was minimally affected by the reboot, and his comic was not relaunched. However, he was still given an updated origin, courtesy of Frank Miller. In addition, Wally West replaced Barry Allen as the Flash, the Justice League's roster was changed, and characters DC acquired from other companies, such as Fawcett Publications and Charlton Comics, were integrated into the DCU. The practice of re-envisioning characters in the new DCU lasted well into 1989, with properties such as Green Lantern, Hawkman, Black Orchid, and the Suicide Squad all being rebooted. The revamp raised sales 22% in the first year, and DC beat Marvel in direct market sales for the first time in August and September 1987. The Man of Steel #1 was the bestselling comic book issue of 1986.

Crisis on Infinite Earths has been referenced several times in the various television series that comprise the Arrowverse, starting with the first episode of The Flash which aired in October 2014. It features a newspaper from 2024 that reads "Flash Missing, Vanishes in Crisis". Grant Gustin, who plays the Flash on the show, has said he thinks the goal of the series is to reach "Crisis on Infinite Earths": "Obviously we'd have to go, I think 10 years to reach that, so there's a possibility for sure. It'll be fun to get there." The concept of a multiverse has been explored several times throughout the history of the franchise. Talking in 2014, Geoff Johns, when discussing the difference between the DC Extended Universe and the Marvel Cinematic Universe, said "We look at it as the multiverse. We have our TV universe and our film universe, but they all co-exist. For us, creatively, it's about allowing everyone to make the best possible product, to tell the best story, to do the best world. Everyone has a vision and you really want to let the visions shine through ... It's just a different approach." The storyline inspired the 2019 Arrowverse crossover, also titled "Crisis on Infinite Earths", with the original date seen in the pilot episode of The Flash having been moved up by five years as a side effect of time travel.

Sequels

Crisis on Infinite Earths is the first installment in what became known as the Crisis trilogy. The second part of the trilogy, the seven-part Infinite Crisis, was written by Geoff Johns and illustrated by Phil Jimenez, Pérez, Ivan Reis, and Jerry Ordway. It was published from October 2005 to June 2006, with a number of tie-in issues. In the series, Kal-L, Alexander Luthor, and Superboy-Prime escape from the pocket dimension they were left in at the end of the original series; Luthor, having gone insane, attempts to recreate the multiverse using the Anti-Monitor's corpse. Whereas Crisis on Infinite Earths discarded the DC Multiverse, Infinite Crisis restored it.

The conclusion to the trilogy, Final Crisis, began in May 2008 and ended in January 2009. The series was written by Grant Morrison, with art by J. G. Jones, Carlos Pacheco, Marco Rudy, and Doug Mahnke. In Final Crisis, Darkseid arrives on Earth and begins a conquest to overthrow reality, as part of a plan by Libra to conquer the Multiverse. The Justice League and Green Lantern Corps join forces in a desperate attempt to stop the upcoming onslaught.

Notes

References

External links
Earth-One, Earth-Two, Crisis on Infinite Earths at Don Markstein's Toonopedia. Archived from the original on June 3, 2016.
 

1985 comics debuts
1986 comics endings
Comics by George Pérez
Comics by Marv Wolfman
Fictional events
Comics about time travel
Comics about parallel universes
Comics about the end of the universe
Reboot comics
Fiction about Earth
Comic book reboots
Mass murder in fiction
Apocalyptic comics